Ford is an unincorporated community in Dinwiddie County, Virginia, United States. This town was a stop on the Southside Railroad in the mid-nineteenth Century. This became the Atlantic, Mississippi and Ohio Railroad in 1870 and then a line in the Norfolk and Western Railway and now the Norfolk Southern Railway.

Ford has a post office with ZIP code 23850.

References

Unincorporated communities in Dinwiddie County, Virginia
Unincorporated communities in Virginia